Frances Beatrice Marshoff (born 17 September 1957) was Premier of the Free State from 2004 to 2009. She succeeded Winkie Direko to the position on 22 April 2004,  and was replaced by Ace Magashule on 6 May 2009.

Marshoff is also a registered nurse and was previously Member of the Executive Council (MEC) for Social Development in the Free State (June 2001 - 21 April 2004).  Before that, she was a member of Parliament for the African National Congress (1994–1999).

References 

1957 births
Living people
People from Bloemfontein
Premiers of the Free State (province)
African National Congress politicians
Women premiers of South African provinces
South African nurses
Members of the Free State Provincial Legislature